Bugno is an Italian surname. Notable people with the surname include:

Alessio Bugno (born 1990), Italian footballer
Gianni Bugno (born 1964), Italian cyclist
Richard Bugno (1885–?), Austrian footballer
Walter Bugno, Australian chief executive

Italian-language surnames